HMS Chester was a 50-gun fourth rate ship of the line of the Royal Navy, built at Chatham Dockyard to the 1706 Establishment of dimensions, and launched on 18 October 1708. Chester was placed on harbour service in 1743 and was broken up in 1749.

Chester along with HMS Canterbury, during the War of Jenkins' Ear captured the Spanish Caracca St Joseph on 23 September 1739. The St.Joseph was probably the most valuable single prize of the war.

Notes

References

Lavery, Brian (2003) The Ship of the Line - Volume 1: The development of the battlefleet 1650-1850. Conway Maritime Press. .

Ships of the line of the Royal Navy
1700s ships